Armagh Cricket Club is a cricket club in Armagh, County Armagh, Northern Ireland, playing in Section 1 of the NCU Senior League.

The club was formed in 1859.

Honours
NCU Senior League: 3
1928, 1931, 1939
NCU Junior Cup: 1
2015

References

External links
Armagh Cricket Club

Cricket clubs in County Armagh
Cricket clubs in Northern Ireland
NCU Senior League members
1859 establishments in Ireland
Sports clubs established in 1859